"She's a Good Girl" is a song by Britpop band Sleeper, written by the band's vocalist and guitarist Louise Wener. "She's a Good Girl" was the first and lead-in single for Sleeper's third album Pleased to Meet You and became the group's seventh top forty hit on the UK Singles Chart.

Track listing

UK 7" single Indolent SLEEP 015 (ltd edition)
UK cassette single Indolent SLEEP 015MC

"She's a Good Girl" 
"Come On Come On"

UK CD single Indolent SLEEP 015CD
Australia CD single BMG 74321 53352-2

"She's a Good Girl" 
"Come On Come On" 
"I'm a Man"

Comprehensive Charts

References

External links
"She's a Good Girl" music video

1997 singles
Sleeper (band) songs
Songs written by Louise Wener
Song recordings produced by Stephen Street
1997 songs